Montignies-sur-Sambre is a town of Wallonia and a district of the municipality of Charleroi, located in the province of Hainaut, Belgium.  

It was a municipality of its own before the fusion of the Belgian municipalities in 1977.

Education 
Montignies hosts the UCLouvain Charleroi campus of the University of Louvain.

Notable persons 
 Paul Finet (1897-1965), politician
 Joëlle Milquet (born 1961), politician

Sub-municipalities of Charleroi
Former municipalities of Hainaut (province)